Vacation in Reno  is a 1946 film directed by Leslie Goodwins and starring Jack Haley, Anne Jeffreys, Iris Adrian, Wally Brown, Alan Carney, and Morgan Conway.

Plot
Jack Carroll (portrayed by Jack Haley) and his wife (Anne Jeffreys) have an argument about their friends, but when he makes a crack that his mother-in-law is a "fat porpoise," they fight and she leaves him.

Jack runs into two strange men right before they burglarize a bank, leaving Jack to be the only one to identify. Because of this, he takes a vacation to Reno and checks into the Bar Nothing Ranch. Later, the robbers come to Reno and check in. They bury a suitcase of money where Jack plans to find it with his metal detector. Jack finds the money, but is taken by another lady.

This is the beginning of his troubles, where he encounters different men: a sheriff, a sailor, and a gun moll who convinces the police that she is Mrs. Carroll. Jack's wife arrives and Jack is unable to adequately explain things to her before she gets a divorce.

Cast 
 Jack Haley as Jack Carroll 
 Anne Jeffreys as Eleanor 
 Wally Brown as Eddie Roberts 
 Iris Adrian as Bunny Wells 
 Morgan Conway as Joe 
 Alan Carney as Angel 
 Myrna Dell as Mrs. Dumont 
 Matt McHugh as William Dumont 
 Claire Carleton as Sally Beaver 
 Jason Robards Sr. as Sheriff 
 Matt Willis as Hank the Deputy

References

External links 
 
 
 
 

1946 films
Films directed by Leslie Goodwins
American black-and-white films
1946 comedy films
American comedy films
Films scored by Paul Sawtell
1940s English-language films
1940s American films